is a former Japanese football player and manager. He is the current manager of Blaublitz Akita.

Playing career
Yoshida was born in Tokyo on March 1, 1970. He played for Yomiuri, NKK, Ventforet Kofu and Jatco. He retired in 1998.

Coaching career
After playing in lower leagues and being a coach for the local time since 1999, Yoshida was appointed at Azul Claro Numazu as manager of first squad in December 2014. He took charge of the squad, which was promoted to pro-football in 2016, after coming 3rd in 2016 season. This brought Azul Claro to play for the first time in J3 League.

He saw his contract renewed, ready to tackle pro-football and guide Azul Claro even in J3.

Honours
 Blaublitz Akita
 J3 League (1): 2020

Managerial statistics
Update; October 26, 2022

References

External links

Profile at Numazu
Profile at Akita

1970 births
Living people
Japanese footballers
Association football people from Tokyo
Japan Soccer League players
Japan Football League (1992–1998)
Tokyo Verdy players
NKK SC players
Ventforet Kofu players
Jatco SC players
Japanese football managers
J2 League managers
J3 League managers
Azul Claro Numazu managers
Blaublitz Akita managers
Association football defenders